Frank Bsirske (born 10 February 1952) is a German trade unionist and politician and of Alliance 90/The Greens who has been serving as a member of the Bundestag since 2021. From 2001 to 2019, he was the chairman of the United Services Trade Union (ver.di).

Early life and education
Bsirske was born 1952 in the West German town of Heiligenstadt. He later studied political science at Free University of Berlin.

Chair of ver.di, 2001–2019
From 2001 to 2019, Bsirske served as the chairman of the United Services Trade Union (ver.di). In this capacity, he was also member of the board of the European Trade Union Confederation (ETUC) and the president of UNI Global's Europe section.

In 2015, Federal Minister for Economic Affairs and Energy Sigmar Gabriel appointed Bsirske to the government's advisory board on the Transatlantic Trade and Investment Partnership (TTIP).

Political career
Bsirske was elected to the Bundestag in 2021, representing the Helmstedt – Wolfsburg district. In parliament, he has since been serving on the Ministry of Social Affairs and Labour.

In the negotiations to form a so-called traffic light coalition of the Social Democratic Party (SPD), the Green Party and the Free Democratic Party (FDP) following the 2021 German elections, Bsirske was part of his party's delegation in the working group on labour policy, co-chaired by Hubertus Heil, Katharina Dröge and Johannes Vogel.

Other activities

Corporate boards
 Deutsche Vermögensberatung (DVAG), member of the Advisory Board (since 2021)
 Innogy, member of the Supervisory Board (2016–2019)
 Deutsche Bank, member of the Supervisory Board (2013–2021)
 Postbank, member of the Supervisory Board (2010–2021)
 RWE, member of the Supervisory Board (2001–2021)
 KfW, member of the Board of Supervisory Directors (2006–2018)
 IBM Germany, member of the Supervisory Board (–2017)
 Lufthansa, member of the Supervisory Board (–2013)

Non-profit organizations
 German Federation for the Environment and Nature Conservation (BUND), member
 Tennis Borussia Berlin, member

Political positions
In 2016, Bsirske criticized the German government’s support for the EU’s Comprehensive Economic and Trade Agreement (CETA) with Canada.

In 2022, Bsirske went against the party line and voted against the Scholz government's motion to change Germany’s constitution to allow for a credit-based special defense fund of 100 billion euros ($107.35 billion) proposed after Russia's invasion of Ukraine.

Personal life
Bsirske has been married to Bettina Jankovsky since 1993. From 2002 to 2021, the couple lived in Berlin's Charlottenburg district before moving to Dahlem district.

References

Living people
1952 births
Alliance 90/The Greens politicians
Members of the Bundestag 2021–2025
21st-century German politicians
Free University of Berlin alumni

German trade union leaders